Wang Jie (born 4 December 1983 in Ili, Xinjiang) is a female Chinese professional beach volleyball player.

Career 
Wang has partnered with Tian Jia since the start of the 2006 season and they are currently fifth in the world rankings. She won four titles with Tian, most recently in Hong Kong in 2007. The other two came in back-to-back events in Austria and Poland in 2006, and in Shanghai in 2007. A very consistent tandem, the duo has made 15 podium finishes in addition to those four victories, finishing runner-up seven times in 2007 and eight overall, finishing atop the FIVB standings in 2007.

Wang had originally partnered with Linjun Ji upon entering the FIVB circuit in 2003, but made only three top-10 finishes, highlighted by a fifth-place finish in her debut in Greece in 2003, and did not return to beach volleyball until partnering with Tian.

She competed at the beach volleyball event at the 2008 Summer Olympics with Tian. They were undefeated up to the finals where they lost against Misty May-Treanor and Kerri Walsh of the United States, winning the silver medal.

Sponsors 
 Swatch

See also 
 China at the 2008 Summer Olympics

References

External links
 
 

1983 births
Living people
Chinese female beach volleyball players
Olympic beach volleyball players of China
Olympic silver medalists for China
Olympic medalists in beach volleyball
Asian Games medalists in beach volleyball
Asian Games bronze medalists for China
Medalists at the 2006 Asian Games
Medalists at the 2008 Summer Olympics
Beach volleyball players at the 2006 Asian Games
Beach volleyball players at the 2008 Summer Olympics
People from Ürümqi
Volleyball players from Xinjiang